Nemška Vas is a village in the hills west of Leskovec pri Krškem in the Municipality of Krško in eastern Slovenia. The area is part of the traditional region of Lower Carniola. It is now included with the rest of the municipality in the Lower Sava Statistical Region.

The local church, built on a hill east of the settlement, is dedicated to Saint Stephen and belongs to the Parish of Leskovec pri Krškem. It is a medieval building that was rebuilt in the Romanesque style in the 18th century.

References

External links
Nemška Vas on Geopedia

Populated places in the Municipality of Krško